Creti is a surname. Notable people with the surname include:

Donato Creti (1671–1749), Italian painter 
Marcello Creti (1922–2000), Italian inventor, gem prospector, and reported healer
Vasco Creti (1874–1945), Italian film actor

See also
Poboru